Streblus asper is a tree known by several common names, including Siamese rough bush, khoi, serut, and toothbrush tree. It is a medium-sized tree native to dry regions in Indonesia, Cambodia, Thailand, India, Sri Lanka, Malaysia, and Vietnam.

In the Philippines, it is commonly known as "bogta-e","bogtalay", and "Kalyos". In Cambodia, it is known as Snay. Several rural communes in Cambodia were named after the tree such as Snay Pol village (Poisonous Snay) of Prey Veng and Krang Snay (Hill of Snay) of Kampot Province. In Malaysia, it is known as "kesinai".

Description

Staminate flower heads are spherical with minute flowers; pistillate flowers have longer peduncles.

Common names 
English: Sand Paper Tree, Siamese rough bush, Toothbrush tree
Hindi: Daheya, Dahia(दहिया), Karchanna, Rusa, Sahora, Sihora(सिहोरा)
Marathi: poi, karera, kharoli, kharota, sahor
Indonesia: Serut
Tamil: kurripila, kuttippirai, parayan, pasuna
Malayalam: parakam, paruva, sakhotavrksam, tinda-parua
Telugu: baranika, baranki, barinika
Kannada: akhor moranu, mitala
Bengali: (শ্যেওড়া) sehora, sahra, shewra, shaora
Oriya: sahada,(ସାହାଡ଼ା) hirtonimranu
Assamese: khorua, saura gach
Khasi: dieng sohkhyrdang
Sanskrit: akshadhara, bhutavasa, bhutavriksha, dhukavasa, gavakshi, karkashachhada
Malay: Kesinai
Tagalog: kalyós

Uses

Papermaking

The tree has a number of uses. It has been important in papermaking in Thailand for seven hundred years. Virtually all of the ancient Thai documents still in existence are written on the bark of this tree. The Buddhist texts and official records from before the twentieth century in Thailand are known as khoi books. The paper is durable even in the local high-humidity climate. It does not burn easily and it is resistant to yellowing and insect damage. Today other fiber sources are used to make paper and khoi fibers are used primarily by artisans who produce paper using traditional techniques.

In Vietnam traditional woodworking uses the coarse texture of the leaves as natural sandpaper.

Health

Various parts of the plant are used in Ayurveda and other folk medicines for the treatment of different ailments such as filariasis, leprosy, toothache, diarrhoea, and cancer. It is a well known and documented ethnomedicinal plant. Research carried out using different in vitro and in vivo techniques of biological evaluation support most of these claims.

It has been used in the past as an oral hygiene product and for this reason it is also known as the toothbrush tree. A twig or stick about eight inches long with a frayed or mashed end to increase the cleaning surface was used as a tooth cleaning aid up until the middle of the twentieth century when the cheap and more practical plastic brush with a toothpaste become common throughout the world. It is the main active ingredient of a popular brand of a herbal, dark brown toothpaste in Thailand.

Different studies were carried on its antibacterial activity upon various microorganisms involving oral and nasopharyngeal infections and especially Streptococcus mutans. An extract of Strebulus asper leaves have demonstrated to possess a selective bactericidal activity towards Streptococcus, especially to S. mutans which has been shown to be strongly linked with dental caries.

The Khoi wood is used throughout Southeast Asia as an ingredient mixed with cannabis which reduces the throat irritation associated with inhaling cannabis smoke through a water pipe or bong.

Protein coagulation

Streblus Asper contains protease which has a potential as a milk coagulating enzyme.

References

External links
Pre clinical studies of Streblus asper Lour in terms of behavioural safety and toxicity.
Medical research and properties
History of paper production in Thailand

asper
Flora of the Indian subcontinent
Flora of Indo-China